Brazeau may refer to:

Places

Canada
Brazeau, an obsolete alternative name for Nordegg, a hamlet in Alberta
Brazeau County, a municipal district in Alberta
Brazeau River, a river in Alberta
Brazeau Reservoir, a man-made lake in Alberta
Mount Brazeau, a mountain in the Canadian Rockies of Alberta

United States
Brazeau, Wisconsin, a town in Oconto County, Wisconsin, United States
Brazeau, Missouri, an unincorporated community in southeastern Perry County, Missouri, United States
Brazeau Township, Perry County, Missouri, a township in Perry County, Missouri
Brazeau Bottom, an alluvial floodplain in Perry County, Missouri
Brazeau Creek, a stream in Perry County, Missouri

Geography
Brazeau Bottom, an alluvial floodplain in Perry County, Missouri
Brazeau Creek, a stream in Perry County, Missouri

People 
 Alexander Brazeau, American politician
 Jim Brazeau (born 1968), American soccer goalkeeper
 Patrick Brazeau (born 1974), Canadian aboriginal activist and senator
 Theodore W. Brazeau (1873–1965), American politician